The women's +86 kg powerlifting event at the 2020 Summer Paralympics was contested on 30 August at Tokyo International Forum.

Records
There are twenty powerlifting events, corresponding to ten weight classes each for men and women.

Results

References

Powerlifting at the 2020 Summer Paralympics
2021 in women's weightlifting